Vanishing Act(s) may refer to:

Film
 The Vanishing Act, an unreleased Indian English-language documentary film
 Vanishing Act, a 1986 television film featuring Mike Farrell

Literature
 Vanishing Act, a Sports Beat novel by John Feinstein
 Vanishing Act, a 1995 Jane Whitefield novel by Thomas Perry
 Vanishing Acts, a 2005 novel by Jodi Picoult

Television episodes
 "Vanishing Act" (Bernard's Watch)
 "Vanishing Act" (Blue Heelers)
 "Vanishing Act" (Diagnosis: Murder)
 "Vanishing Act" (ER)
 "Vanishing Act" (Law & Order: Criminal Intent)
 "Vanishing Act" (Nash Bridges)
 "Vanishing Act" (The Outer Limits)
 "Vanishing Act" (Power Rangers: Turbo)
 "Vanishing Act" (Xena: Warrior Princess)
 "Vanishing Act" an episode of Creepy Crawlers

See also 
 Magic (illusion)